Božidar Milojković alias BAM (born 28 December 1952) is a Serbian cartoonist, comic book and comic strip artist, illustrator and scriptwriter. He garnered acclaim in Yugoslavia and abroad under the pseudonym BAM.

Biography

He was born in Sremska Mitrovica, and grew up in Belgrade. He debuted in Yugoslav cartooning industry in 1975, later becoming a member of "Beogradski krug 2" artistic group.

His notable works include Acidités de couleur noire, with Dragan de Lazare and Lazar Odanović, and "Paceri". He lives in Belgrade.

References

External links
 "Acidités de couleur noire", official site 
 BAM, official site (sr)
 De Lazare, Dragan. Blogografija: BAMova strip avantura, 2015. (sr)

1952 births
Living people
Serbian comics artists
Serbian comics writers
Serbian cartoonists
Serbian illustrators
People from Sremska Mitrovica
Artists from Belgrade